Lichtenvoorde-Groenlo is a railway station for Lichtenvoorde and Groenlo. The station opened on 24 June 1878 and is located on the Zutphen–Winterswijk railway. The services are operated by Arriva. Even though the station name refers to the villages of Lichtenvoorde and Groenlo, the actual station location is in Lievelde.

Train services

Bus services

External links
NS website 
Dutch Public Transport journey planner 

Railway stations in Gelderland
Railway stations opened in 1878
Oost Gelre
1878 establishments in the Netherlands
Railway stations in the Netherlands opened in the 19th century